Hamlyn Terrace is a suburb of the Central Coast region of New South Wales, Australia. It is part of the  local government area. The suburb was formerly part of Warnervale and is part of the Warnervale development precinct. The suburb is split between two governmental wards in the Central Coast Council governmental area, the northern part is in the Budgiewoi ward and the rest is in the Wyong ward.

References

External links 
 Budgiewoi and Wyong Wards

Suburbs of the Central Coast (New South Wales)